Galva Township may refer to the following places in the United States:
 Galva Township, Henry County, Illinois
 Galva Township, Ida County, Iowa

Township name disambiguation pages